Señorita República Dominicana 1986 was held on December 19, 1985. There were 18 candidates who competed for the national crown. The winner represented the Dominican Republic at the Miss Universe 1986 . The Señorita República Dominicana Mundo will enter Miss World 1986. The Señorita República Dominicana Latina will enter Miss América Latina 1986.

Results

Delegates

Azua - Ana Lucía Peralta Padrón
Baoruco - Margarita Ramos Abreu
Distrito Nacional - Ada Espinosa Castro
Distrito Nacional - Jeanette McCollum Sanlley
Distrito Nacional - Livia Pastrana Mora
Distrito Nacional - Margy Rosario Moya
Distrito Nacional - Milta Languasco Melo
Distrito Nacional - Miriam Benítez Henríquez
Distrito Nacional - Sigrid García Lavó
Distrito Nacional  - Ana Patricia Santa Cruz Noriega
Duarte - Lucresia Tavarez Hidalgo
La Romana - Myosotis de la Cruz Palmas
La Vega - Lucía Josefina Collado Familia
María Trinidad Sánchez - Reyna Rodríguez Espinal
Monte Cristi - Lissette Selena Chamorro Rodríguez
Pedernales - Laura Brea Tejede
Puerto Plata - Ana Perón Morel
Salcedo - Aurora Medina Marchena
Samaná - Andrea Perdomo Quirós
Sánchez Ramírez - Eva de los Santos Vargas
San Juan - Eugenia María Pichardo Polanco
Santiago - Cristiana Hermoso Gurabo
Santiago - Susana González Pérez
Santiago - Tatiana de Ramírez Veras
Valverde - Juana Ynoa Vega

External links
 https://web.archive.org/web/20090211102742/http://ogm.elcaribe.com.do/ogm/consulta.aspx
 https://web.archive.org/web/20141113002044/http://www.missamericalatina.com/Results.htm#_1985

Miss Dominican Republic
1986 beauty pageants
1986 in the Dominican Republic